William Arthur ("Art") Kirk was an American mathematician. His research interests include nonlinear functional analysis, the geometry of Banach spaces and metric spaces. In particular, he has made notable contributions to the fixed point theory of metric spaces; for example, he is one of the two namesakes of the Caristi-Kirk fixed point theorem of 1976. He is also known for the Kirk theorem of 1964.

He completed his PhD, entitled "Metrization of Surface Curvature", at the University of Missouri in August 1962 under the supervision of Leonard Blumenthal. He then became an assistant professor of mathematics at the University of California, Riverside from 1962 to 1967. Since 1967 he has worked from the University of Iowa, as a full professor of mathematics since 1971 and as department chair from 1985 to 1991.

He holds an honorary doctorate from Maria Curie-Skłodowska University, an institution which was an early centre of study for the fixed point theory of metric spaces.

External links
 
 William A. Kirk's personal webpage at the University of Iowa
 Honorary doctorate from Maria Curie-Skłodowska University:
 Kazimierz Goebel's introduction
 William A. Kirk's acceptance speech

20th-century American mathematicians
21st-century American mathematicians
University of Iowa faculty
University of Missouri alumni
Living people
Year of birth missing (living people)